Pierre Jean Stéphen Boyer (born 10 April 1996) is a French professional volleyball player. He is a member of the France national team. The 2020 Olympic Champion and the 2017 World League winner. At the professional club level, he plays for Jastrzębski Węgiel.

Career
In 2017, Boyer was appointed as a member of the French national volleyball team for the FIVB World League by the head coach Laurent Tillie. On 9 July 2017 France, including Stéphen Boyer, won 2017 World League after beating Brazil in the final.

Honours

Clubs
 CEV Challenge Cup
  2016/2017 – with Chaumont VB 52 

 National championships
 2016/2017  French Championship, with Chaumont VB 52 
 2017/2018  French SuperCup, with Chaumont VB 52
 2020/2021  Emir Cup, with Al Rayyan
 2021/2022  Polish SuperCup, with Jastrzębski Węgiel
 2022/2023  Polish SuperCup, with Jastrzębski Węgiel

Individual awards
 2016: French Championship – Best Opposite
 2017: French SuperCup – Most Valuable Player
 2018: French Championship – Most Valuable Player
 2018: French Championship – Best Opposite

References

External links

 
 Player profile at LegaVolley.it 
 Player profile at PlusLiga.pl 
 
 Player profile at Volleybox.net

1996 births
Living people
People from Saint-Denis, Réunion
French men's volleyball players
Olympic volleyball players of France
Volleyball players at the 2020 Summer Olympics
Medalists at the 2020 Summer Olympics
Olympic gold medalists for France
Olympic medalists in volleyball
French expatriate sportspeople in Italy
Expatriate volleyball players in Italy
French expatriate sportspeople in Qatar
Expatriate volleyball players in Qatar
French expatriate sportspeople in Poland
Expatriate volleyball players in Poland
Jastrzębski Węgiel players
Opposite hitters